Protein losing enteropathy refers to any condition of the gastrointestinal tract (e.g. damage to the gut wall) that results in a net loss of protein from the body.

Signs and symptoms
The signs/symptoms of protein losing enteropathy are consistent with diarrhea, fever, and general abdominal discomfort. Swelling of the legs due to peripheral edema can also occur, however, if the PLE is related to a systemic disease such as congestive heart failure or constrictive pericarditis, then the symptoms could be of the primary disease development.

Causes
The causes of protein-losing enteropathy can include GI conditions (among other causes), like the following:

Mechanism

The pathophysiology of protein losing enteropathy is a result of plasma proteins loss, which enters GI tract (lumen). PLE is a complication of a disorder, be it lymphatic obstruction or mucosal injury.

In pediatric protein losing enteropathy there are several changes in epithelial cells causing PLE by augmenting the rate of flow of proteins (serum). Congenital molecular abnormalities, or dysfunctional lymphatic drainage might cause epithelial matrix changes. Proteoglycans, which are glycosaminoglycan chains attached to protein, directly causes PLE, as well as, augments inflammatory cytokines. Children who have congenital glycosylation defects usually have protein losing enteropathy.

Diagnosis
The diagnosis of protein losing enteropathy is made by excluding other causes of protein loss. Endoscopy can be used to localize the cause of the protein loss in the bowel. Different methods include faecal excretion of alpha 1-antitrypsin which is a marker of protein losing enteropathy, as well as, viral serologies which may be useful to detect PLE.

Treatment
Treatment for protein losing enteropathy depends upon the underlying condition, according to Rychik, et al this could mean treatment of hypoproteinemia or of the intestinal mucosa.

For causes related to the heart, treatment for PLE after the Fontan operation treatment must be equal to the level of hypoproteinemia present. Therefore, it is useful to categorize patients based on their serum albumin levels, if less than normal (typically less than 3.5 g/dL) but greater than 2.5 g/dL, this can be seen as a mild form of protein losing enteropathy. Symptomatic management of edema with furosemide (and aldactone) can provide relief for the individual with mild hypoproteinemia.

In animals 
Dogs can also suffer from PLE. Because the proteins are lost from the intestine, these dogs have low levels of albumin in the blood. Chronic enteropathy is one of the possible reasons for PLE and it has been shown in a study that hypoalbuminaemia is a risk factor for negative outcome and the prognosis is guarded for these dogs. Gastrointestinal lymphoma and intestinal lymphangiectasia are other diseases that can cause protein losing enteropathy in dogs  The Breed Lundehunds seem to be predisposed for PLE.

References

Further reading

External links 

Gastrointestinal tract disorders